Lysiphragma is a genus of moths belonging to the family Tineidae.

Species
Lysiphragma adreptella (Walker, 1864)
Lysiphragma argentaria Salmon, 1948
Lysiphragma epixyla Meyrick, 1888
Lysiphragma howesii Quail, 1901
Lysiphragma mixochlora Meyrick, 1888

References

Tineidae
Tineidae genera
Taxa named by Edward Meyrick